
Belton is a village in the civil parish of Belton and Manthorpe, in the South Kesteven district of Lincolnshire, England.

History
The Saxon meaning of Belton is "a bell-shaped hollow".

The village is significant for the 1686 Grade I listed Belton House. The house is the property of the National Trust and is open to the public.

A church at Belton is recorded in the Domesday Book. The Church of St Peter and St Paul is significant for its Norman, late Medieval, Georgian and Victorian alterations and additions.

In May 1643 Parliamentary cavalry, under the leadership of Oliver Cromwell, clashed with Royalist forces at the south of Belton Park, to the east of Manthorpe. The Belton church register records "May 1643, buried three unknown soldiers, slain in Belton fight".

Community
Belton comprises thirty-one predominantly stone-built houses, most standing within a defined Conservation Area, with a further twelve homes outlying the village centre.

The village is part of the ecclesiastical parish of Belton. The church is dedicated to Saints Peter and Paul, and is part of the Loveden Deanery of the Diocese of Lincoln. The 2014 incumbent is Rev Stuart Hadley.

Businesses in the village include a hotel with golf course, a farm equipment dealer, an auto parts manufacturer and a garden centre.

Belton is bypassed by the A607, a road which links Grantham to the south, and Lincoln to the north along which runs a Stagecoach Group bus service.

References

External links 

 Belton Parish web site. Retrieved 28 June 2011
 Belton Church
 Belton village. Retrieved 18 December 2010
 Video postcard depicting Belton Tower. Retrieved 18 December 2010

Villages in Lincolnshire
Grantham
South Kesteven District